Maisha Bora is a village in central Kenya. It is in the eastern province of the country and is a subset of the town Isiolo in this division.

There are 1,500 inhabitants who speak the Turkana language and, predominantly, share a Somalian heritage and the Muslim religion. The main form of employment is slaughterhouse work, with rope making and bread baking.

There is currently a single-roomed nursery hut within the community but no school. Children who do attend school are generally earning an income from a young age. Combined with the small average income of residents the poor access to education has led to the low levels of literacy and school completion rates today.

A local stream provides water for washing and drinking, though it is not piped, and electricity and formal sanitation systems are also not present in the community. The rates of HIV/AIDS have been affected by the high level of truck traffic passing through Isiolo which has fuelled a sex trade regionally.

References 

Populated places in Eastern Province (Kenya)
Isiolo County